CBC Ottawa refers to:
CBO-FM, CBC Radio One on 91.5 FM
CBOQ-FM, CBC Radio 2 on 103.3 FM
CBOT-DT, CBC Television on channel 4

SRC Ottawa refers to:
CBOF-FM, Première Chaîne on 90.7 FM
CBOX-FM, Espace musique on 102.5 FM
CBOFT-DT, Ici Radio-Canada Télé on channel 9

See also:
CBC Ottawa Broadcast Centre, the main CBC/Radio-Canada premises in Ottawa